John Stickney, born in Stoughton, Massachusetts in 1742, died in South Hadley, Massachusetts in 1826, was one of the first American composers.  He published "The Gentlemen and Ladies' Musical Companion" (Newburyport, 1774), a collection of psalms and anthems, and rules to learn singing.

References

American male composers
American composers
1742 births
1826 deaths